Hasanabad-e Chah Degan (also Romanized as Ḩasanābād-e Chāh Degān; also known as Ḩasanābād, Ḩasanābād-e Chāh Degāl, and Ḩasanābād-e Chāheh Gol) is a village in Chahdegal Rural District, Negin Kavir District, Fahraj County, Kerman Province, Iran. At the 2006 census, its population was 372, in 76 families.

References 

Populated places in Fahraj County